Abyssochrysos bicinctus is a species of sea snail, a marine gastropod mollusk in the family Abyssochrysidae.

Description

Distribution
This marine species occurs in the Makassar Strait, Indonesia.

References

 Bouchet P. (1991). New records and new species of Abyssochrysos (Mollusca, Caenogastropoda). Journal of Natural History 25(2): 305–313

bicinctus
Gastropods described in 1991